Ong Mei Lin (born 23 February 1952) is a Malaysian former backstroke and medley swimmer. She competed in three events at the 1972 Summer Olympics.

References

1952 births
Living people
Malaysian female backstroke swimmers
Malaysian female medley swimmers
Olympic swimmers of Malaysia
Swimmers at the 1972 Summer Olympics
Place of birth missing (living people)
Southeast Asian Games medalists in swimming
Southeast Asian Games bronze medalists for Malaysia
Southeast Asian Games gold medalists for Malaysia
Competitors at the 1969 Southeast Asian Peninsular Games
20th-century Malaysian women